Scaphyglottis micrantha is a species of orchid found from Central America to northwestern Ecuador.

References

External links

micrantha
Orchids of Ecuador